Pseudomonas thermotolerans is a Gram-negative, aerobic, rod-shaped bacterium found in the industrial cooking water of a cork-processing plant. It is capable of surviving at 47 °C (117 °F), hence its name. The type strain is DSM 14292.

References

External links
Type strain of Pseudomonas thermotolerans at BacDive -  the Bacterial Diversity Metadatabase

Pseudomonadales
Bacteria described in 2002